1974 Ramna Massacre was a massacre of Jatiyo Samajtantarik Dal supporters that took place on March 17, 1974. The incident took place when a demonstrators from the Jatiyo Samajtantrik Dal, who were blockading the residence of the Home Minister Mansur Ali, located in the Ramna area of Dhaka, was fired upon by members of Jatiya Rakkhi Bahini. The incident reportedly claimed at least fifty lives.

Background 

After Bangladesh won its independence through the liberation war of 1971, an ideological conflict was raised on the question of how Bangladesh will be governed. When Awami League leadership opted for democracy as its first choice, a large section of Awami League's students front Bangladesh Students League led by A. S. M. Abdur Rab and Shajahan Siraj expressed their dissent with the idea. This section, mostly the followers of former General Secretary of the front Serajul Alam Khan, formed a new political party opposing the Awami League's view and to establish a form of socialism what they called Scientific Socialism.

Soon after the formation of Jatiya Samajtantrik Dal, the Jasad-fueled protests were met with Sheikh Mujibur Rahman's Jatiya Rakkhi Bahini personnel who were accused of conducting raids in the opposition politicians houses, torture, murders and abductions of the opposition activist.

Declaration 
Due to the corruption, misappropriation of relief item, hoarding of essential goods by marketeers, and smuggling of food grains to India, during the initials days of 1974, there was inflation. Moreover, the Jatiya Rakkhi Bahini came down hard handed on the protests. Jasad presented 29 points and declared to surround the government establishments those were linked with the distribution of relief goods and food grains on February 10 of 1974 through a public statement if the points were ignored. The statement read,

The declaration gave Awami League government around one month time to take necessary measures or to face dire consequence on March 17.

March 17 

On March 17, supporters of Jasad and the oppressed people of the capital and its surrounding areas started gathering at the Paltan ground of the capital as Jasad called a public meeting to mark the deadline of the ultimatum. They also distributed anti- government leaflets.

The rally was supposed to end before the sunset and a then march towards the residence of Home Minister Mansur Ali to submit a Memorandum of Redemption after laying a seize around the house for some moment.

But once the meeting began, it started getting agitated by the speeches of A. S. M. Abdur Rab, Mohammad Abdul Jalil and other leaders. The crowd subsequently became crazy. After the meeting ended, a large group of people started marching towards Minto Road of Ramna area where the residence of the Home Minister is located. After reaching the gate of the residence, the crowd laid a siege around the residence. An agitated group of people tried to burn down the gate.

Police charged the crowd to disperse the rally and foil the siege, and a clash ensued between the police and the Jasad men. Jasad men started throwing brickbats targeting the police after the police started firing tear gas shells over the crowd. Within minutes, the area turned into a battlefield and the Jatiya Rakkhi Bahini was called on.

Once the armed Jatiya Rakkhi Bahini personnel reached the place with trucks, they started firing live bullets on the crowd. At this point the Jasad activists fell down on the streets to save themselves from the bullets. But the Rakkhis then started firing at the ground to ensure that the death toll gets higher than ever.

According to A. S. M. Abdur Rab:

After gunning down the political opponents of the government, Rakkhi Bahini personnel and the police arrested almost all the leaders of Jasad from the spot. Arrestees included Major Jalil, A.S.M. Abdur Rab, Momtaz Begum, Moinuddin Khan Badal and many others. All of them received bullet injuries and were taken to the hospital for treatment.

Death toll 

The death toll of the massacre varies from six to around fifty. The government, after the incident issued a pressnote blaming Jasad for what happened. The government pressnote claimed that only six people died during the "clash" and some 20 people got injured. Jasad in an official statement claimed that the death toll is at least fifty.

Ahmad Ullah Khan was a Deputy Superintendent of Police at Tejgaon of the capital Dhaka. He confirmed that 40-50 dead bodies were taken away by Rakkhi Bahini in their trucks that day.

Aftermath 

All but Momtaz Begum who was a student were landed in the jail that day. They were released only after the Assassination of Sheikh Mujibur Rahman. However, Moinuddin Khan Badal eloped from the hospital.

The Daily Ganakantha was the spokesman of Jasad, and many of its correspondents were present during the incident to cover the protest rally. After the massacre that lasted for almost one hour, journalists from Daily Ganakantha prepared a news item on the death of around 50 Jasad supporters and the abduction of their corpses by Jatiya Rakkhi Bahini personnel. But the news was not published as the police and Jatiya Rakkhi Bahini personnel raided the office of Ganakantha and arrested the editor, Al Mahmud.

In 2016, Bangladesh Nationalist Party leader Ruhul Kabir Rizvi criticized Hasanul Haq Inu for his role for blockade residence of then Home Minister Mansur Ali.

References

Massacres in Bangladesh
1974 in Bangladesh
Mass murder in 1974
Massacres in 1974
March 1974 events in Asia
1974 murders in Bangladesh
Crime in Dhaka